Mohammad Tawfiq Bakhshi (born March 11, 1986) is an Afghan judoka. He competed at the 2016 Summer Olympics in the men's 100 kg event, in which he was eliminated in the first round by Jorge Fonseca. He was the flag bearer for Afghanistan at the 2016 Summer Olympics Parade of Nations.

References

External links
 

1986 births
Living people
Afghan male judoka
Olympic judoka of Afghanistan
Judoka at the 2016 Summer Olympics
Judoka at the 2014 Asian Games
Asian Games competitors for Afghanistan